HM Prison and Young Offenders Institute Bullingdon is a prison in Oxfordshire, England. It is a public sector prison operated by HM Prison and Probation Service (an executive agency of the Ministry of Justice).

Located near MoD Bicester, it is a local and resettlement prison accepting Security Category B male prisoners. (New admissions from courts are generally sent to 'local' prisons and are considered as a Category B prisoner until their initial security assessment.) Prisoners must be over the age of 18 (as a Young Offender (YO)). As YO prisoners are not subject to the same 4 level security category, they are either considered 'YOI Closed' or 'YOI Open' - depending on whether they are suitable for transfer to open conditions.

The prison generally only holds prisoners on short sentences (under 12 months) and those on remand. With the additional resettlement function, prisoners in the local area of the prison should be transferred for their 12-week pre-release period.

HMP & YOI Bullingdon also has a dedicated 'Vulnerable Prisoners' unit which holds several hundred sex offenders who are at Bullingdon in order to complete a Sex Offender Treatment Programme (SOTP).

History
Opened in 1994, Bullingdon was constructed on obsolete Ministry of Defence site - MoD Bicester. The prison opened with 4 residential units, named after villages in the local area.

 A - Wing (Arncott Unit) 
 B - Wing (Blackthorn Unit) 
 C - Wing (Charndon Unit)
 D - Wing (Dorton Unit)

Each of the 4 wings were created virtually identical, with only different coloured doors to be able to identify the unit.

As the prison population continued to grow the prison constructed 2 new units

 E - Wing (Edgcott Unit) - used to house sex offender prisoners only. 
 F - Wing (Finmere Unit) - Induction / First Night Centre

Since the prison opened back in 1994 it has been surrounded in scandal and failing HMIP reports. The most noticeable is when back in January 2003, former Deputy Governor Terence McLaren was suspended from the prison after he had been arrested on suspicion of being involved with child pornography offences.  Then in 2006, Governor Phil Taylor banned officers from displaying the English Flag as he was fearing that it may upset the foreign prisoners. Alongside this HM Inspectorate of Prisons have published countless damning reports into overcrowding, safety issues, gang violence and drugs to name just a few.

Notable inmates
 Munir Hussain, a businessman who participated with others in severely beating a home invader was held for a month in Bullingdon. 
 Rolf Harris, entertainer and TV personality, found guilty in July 2014 of twelve sex crimes against minors, was imprisoned in Bullingdon instead of HM Prison Wandsworth.

References

External links
Ministry of Justice pages on HMP Bullingdon
HMP Bullingdon - HM Inspectorate of Prisons Reports

Bullingdon
Bullingdon
Bullingdon
Bullingdon
Bullingdon